Bikash Singh Chhetri (born 19 February 1992) is a footballer from Nepal. He played for Nepal national football team in the 2014 FIFA World Cup qualification and various other tournaments.

International career
Bikash Singh Chhetri played for Nepal in 3 World cup qualifying matches. He also played for Nepal in the 2012 Nehru Cup. He was sent off though in a 0-0 draw with India. He scored his first international goal in a 2-1 win match against Bhutan.

International goals

Match fixing allegations
On 14 October 2015 Singh, along with teammates Sandip Rai, Sagar Thapa, Ritesh Thapa and former Three Star Club coach Anjan KC were arrested by the Nepal Police on suspicion that the group was responsible for match-fixing at the domestic and international level. On 19 October 2015 Chhetri and the four others were banned by the Asian Football Confederation.

References

External links

Goal.com Profile
euro sport.com Profile

1992 births
Living people
Nepalese footballers
Nepal international footballers
Manang Marshyangdi Club players
Three Star Club players
Association football defenders
Sportspeople involved in betting scandals